Nelimarkka is a Finnish surname. Notable people with the surname include:

 Eero Nelimarkka (1891–1977), Finnish painter
 George Nelimarkka (1917–2010), American basketball player

Finnish-language surnames